Orticumab (INN) is a human monoclonal antibody that is used as an anti-inflammatory agent and binds to oxLDL. It acts as an immunomodulator.

References 

Monoclonal antibodies